Hal Giuliani Gordon (born August 24, 1987) is an American hot dog vendor and economist. He currently sells hot dogs at Oakland Athletics games and is a Ph.D. candidate at UC Berkeley. He is known as an unofficial mascot for the Athletics.

Career
Gordon was born and raised in Riverwoods, Illinois, in the Chicago metropolitan area. His first jobs were selling hot dogs during Chicago Cubs and Chicago White Sox games at Wrigley Field and U.S. Cellular Field, which he began in the summer of 2005 between high school and college. As he moved from city to city, Gordon took on vending jobs in Chicago (selling during Cubs, White Sox and Blackhawks games), Washington, D.C. (at Nationals games) and, from 2015, the Bay Area with the San Francisco Giants, Oakland Athletics and Oakland Raiders (before their relocation to Las Vegas). Since beginning to vend at Oakland Athletics games, Gordon has become an unofficial mascot for the team, leading fans in cheers while selling hot dogs in his signature red-and-white striped vest, for which he has received mentions on Athletics broadcasters and coverage in local news media. Gordon credits late Oakland A's vendor James Graff for inspiring him to adopt a retro vending aesthetic and focus on entertainment and cheerleading. Gordon is known for having his own baseball cards and merchandise. For the 2020 Major League Baseball season, during which fans (and vendors) were not present at games due to the Covid-19 pandemic, Gordon was represented by a cardboard cutout at the Oakland Coliseum and ran an online campaign to raise money for out-of-work vendors. Writing in an op-ed, Gordon voiced his support for the proposed Howard Terminal Ballpark.

Personal life
Gordon is a Ph.D. candidate studying agriculture and resource economics at the University of California, Berkeley, and reportedly expects to earn his doctorate in 2023. He resides in San Francisco with his wife, who is an evictions defense attorney. Despite his profession as a hot dog vendor, Gordon is a vegetarian.

References

External links

 
 
 Hal Gordon at the University of California, Berkeley

Living people
1987 births
People in retailing
Baseball people from Illinois
People from Chicago
People from Riverwoods, Illinois
Baseball people from California
People from Oakland, California
People from San Francisco
Economists from Illinois
Economists from California
21st-century American economists
Agricultural economists
University of California, Berkeley people
McCourt School of Public Policy alumni
University of Chicago alumni
Oakland Athletics